Gaydar is the supposed ability to identify gay people.

Gaydar may also refer to:

 Gaydar (website), a gay dating website
 Gaydar (film), a 2002 comedy short film
 Gaydar Radio, a British radio station
 A spelling variant of the names Heydar and Gaidar

See also
 
 Geydar (disambiguation)